John Wilkinson Taylor (11 August 1855 – 26 June 1934) was a British Labour Party politician.

Taylor began working at the age of nine, and three years later began an apprenticeship as a blacksmith.  This enabled him to find work above ground at Dipton Colliery, and he became active in the Durham Colliery Mechanics' Association, eventually becoming its secretary.  He also served on the County Durham Mining Federated Board, and as president of the Durham Ages Mineworkers' Homes Association.

Taylor was elected as Member of Parliament for Chester-le-Street at the 1906 general election, and held the seat until he resigned in 1919 due to ill-health.

References

External links 
 

1855 births
1934 deaths
Independent Labour Party MPs
Labour Party (UK) MPs for English constituencies
Miners' Federation of Great Britain-sponsored MPs
UK MPs 1906–1910
UK MPs 1910
UK MPs 1910–1918
UK MPs 1918–1922